The 2002 United States House of Representatives elections in Colorado were held on November 5, 2002, with all seven House seats up for election.  The winners served from January 3, 2003 to January 3, 2005.

Overview

Results

District 1

District 2

District 3

District 4

District 5

District 6

District 7

References

United States House of Representatives elections in Colorado
Colorado
2002 Colorado elections